The Western Interior Seaway, was a large inland sea that started to expand in the early Cretaceous period, though geological evidence suggests it started to expand in the late Jurassic period. It existed at its fullest extent from the mid-late Cretaceous period.

Various different species of fish existed in the Western Interior Seaway, throughout its 30 million time frame. Examples of which

References

Nicholls, Elizabeth L., and Russell, Anthony P. "Paleobiogeography of the Cretaceous Western Interior Seaway of North America: the vertebrate evidence." Paleogeography, Paleoclimatology, Paleoecology 79(1990):149-169
Spencer, Lucas G., and Sullivan M. Robert. Late Cretaceous vertebrates from the Western Interior. Albuquerque: New Mexico Museum of Natural History & Science, 2006. Bulletin 35 http://econtent.unm.edu/cdm/ref/collection/bulletins/id/710

Lists of fishes
Cretaceous United States